Calamaria alidae, commonly known as the Bengkulu reed snake, is a species of snakes in the family Colubridae.

Etymology
The specific name, alidae, is in honor of Alida Brooks who collected natural history specimens in Sumatra with her husband Cecil Joslin Brooks.

Geographic range
C. alidae is endemic to western Sumatra in Indonesia.

Habitat

Description

Reproduction
C. alidae is oviparous.

References

Further reading
Boulenger GA (1920). "Descriptions of a new Gecko and a new Snake from Sumatra". Annals and Magazine of Natural History, Ninth Series 5: 281–283. (Calamaria alidae, new species, pp. 282–283).
Inger RF, Marx H (1965). "The Systematics and Evolution of the Oriental Colubrid Snakes of the Genus Calamaria". Fieldiana: Zoology 49: 1–304. (Calamaria alidae, pp. 235–237, Figure 63).
Marx H, Inger RF (1955). "Notes on Snakes of the Genus Calamaria". Fieldiana: Zoology 37: 167–209. (Calamaria alidae, p. 200).

Calamaria
Snakes of Southeast Asia
Reptiles of Indonesia
Endemic fauna of Sumatra
Reptiles described in 1920
Taxa named by George Albert Boulenger